Burnhaupt-le-Bas is a commune in the Haut-Rhin department in Grand Est in north-eastern France.

See also
 Communes of the Haut-Rhin department

References

Communes of Haut-Rhin